Gavin McGregor Rossdale (born 30 October 1965) is an English guitarist and actor, best known as the lead singer and rhythm guitarist of the rock band Bush. He helped form Bush in 1992; on the band's separation in 2002, he became the lead singer and guitarist for Institute and later began a solo career. He resumed his role in Bush when the band reunited in 2010. In 2013, he received the British Academy's Ivor Novello Award for International Achievement.

Early life
Rossdale was born in Marylebone, London, England, the son of Barbara Stephan (née Bowie) and Douglas Rossdale, a doctor. His mother was born in Scotland, whereas his father was of Russian Jewish descent, with the family's surname originally being "Rosenthal." Rossdale was unable to speak until the age of four, and his parents divorced when he was 11 years old. Rossdale was educated at the independent Westminster School.

Music career

Before Bush
During the 1980s, Rossdale formed a pop band called Midnight with Sacha Puttnam. Despite touring as far afield as Ireland and enjoying support slots for artists including Big Country and Cyndi Lauper, his band saw little success after releasing two singles.

Rossdale later became a member of the group The Little Dukes. According to Alex Tate, the Little Dukes' music was contrary to Rossdale's musical preferences at the time. After traveling to Los Angeles and New York with the hope of being signed to a record label, and crossing paths with a future Bush manager, the band broke up in autumn 1991.

Bush

In 1992, Rossdale established the grunge band Bush, initially known as Future Primitive, as its vocalist and rhythm guitarist after first befriending lead guitarist Nigel Pulsford in November 1991. Their debut album, Sixteen Stone (1994), was a huge commercial success.

Bush's albums include the aforementioned Sixteen Stone, Razorblade Suitcase, Deconstructed, The Science of Things, and Golden State. All albums had commercial success, which led Bush to be one of the best-selling rock groups to come out of the 1990s. Although the band reached superstar status in the US, they failed to have much impact in the UK. The main exception to this was the UK chart success of the album Razorblade Suitcase (Number 4) and its single "Swallowed" (Number 7). A change in record labels and management did not bode well for the band, who disbanded in 2002.

On 21 June 2010, it was announced that Bush would return and planned to release a new album. The Sea of Memories was released on 13 September 2011. Bush have since released three more albums; Man on the Run in 2014, Black and White Rainbows in 2017, The Kingdom in 2020, and The art of survival in  2022.

Other projects
Rossdale performed a song entitled "Adrenaline" for the soundtrack of the film XXX, which features it during the end credits. This song was also the official theme song for WWE's Unforgiven pay-per-view event in September 2002 and also was The Undertaker's Desire/Tribute theme of that same year.  He also guest appeared for Blue Man Group's "The Current" and is featured in its video. This song was used in the ending credits of Terminator 3: Rise of the Machines.

In 2004, after Bush had been on hiatus for two years, Rossdale formed Institute. Their album, Distort Yourself, released on 13 September 2005 achieved moderate success and the single "Bullet Proof Skin" was used in the motion picture Stealth. In an interview published in November 2008, Rossdale noted that the Institute record was, "for all intents and purposes, a solo record. It was just a bad marketing decision to call it something else". Institute broke up in 2006, after one album.

Rossdale's single, "Can't Stop the World", was the introduction theme to Fox's programme, Drive. In 2007, he covered John Lennon's "Mind Games" for the album Instant Karma: The Amnesty International Campaign to Save Darfur. Rossdale's first solo record, entitled Wanderlust, was released 3 June 2008. Gwen Stefani, Rossdale's then wife, sang background vocals on the track "Can't Stop The World", with other vocalists on the album including Shirley Manson, Katy Perry and Dave Stewart. Bush and Institute guitarist Chris Traynor also played on the album. He also made a guest appearance on the DT8 Project album Perfect World, taking lead vocals and co-writing the track Falling.

On 1 April 2008 the first single from WANDERlust, "Love Remains The Same", was released through digital retailers. It entered the Billboard Hot 100 at Number 76, rising to 27 in October 2008, giving Rossdale his first Top 40 hit since the days when he fronted the post-grunge band Bush. Rossdale mounted a full-scale solo tour in Spring 2009. Of the album's title, Rossdale said, "I just liked it because it's kind of sexy enough, it's powerful, it's one word. Wanderlust sums up that desire for music and for singing and performing and this life."

Rossdale also provides the vocals for the Apocalyptica song "End of Me", which is the lead single from their latest album 7th Symphony.

Rossdale was a judge for the 10th annual Independent Music Awards to support independent artists' careers. In 2013, Rossdale was awarded in the Ivor Novello Awards, for International Achievement in Songwriting, which was presented to him by Chris Martin. On 27 October 2017, Rossdale sang with Linkin Park at their special memorial concert in memory of vocalist Chester Bennington. He performed the song "Leave Out All the Rest".

Acting career
Rossdale appeared in the film Constantine (2005) playing the half-demon Balthazar. He has also appeared in the films Zoolander (2001), Mayor of the Sunset Strip (2004), Little Black Book (2004), the Game of Their Lives (2005), How to Rob a Bank (2008), and The Bling Ring (2013). Additionally, he appeared in the crime drama television series Criminal Minds in the episode "The Performer" (2009), portraying a rock star named Paul Davies who takes a vampire-like alter-ego named Dante whose music is involved in a string of exsanguination murders. Rossdale has also appeared in the eighth episode of season 5 of Burn Notice, and appeared as villain Johnny Moreau in the 100th episode of Hawaii Five-0 in November 2014.

Personal life

In the late 1980s, Rossdale dated Suze DeMarchi, lead singer for the band Baby Animals. Bush's song "Comedown" from 1994's Sixteen Stone is about their relationship.

In 1995, Rossdale met Gwen Stefani, lead singer of the rock band No Doubt, when Bush and No Doubt were on tour together. During a break in his relationship with Stefani, Rossdale dated Hole frontwoman and Kurt Cobain's widow Courtney Love for eight months in 1995 and 1996. Love commented, "Everyone gave me so much shit, because Gavin sounded a lot like Kurt." Rossdale then married Stefani in 2002. The two have three sons together: born in May 2006, August 2008, and February 2014. On 3 August 2015, Stefani filed for divorce from Rossdale, citing irreconcilable differences. The divorce was finalized in April 2016. From 2017 until 2018 Rossdale was in a relationship with German model Sophia Thomalla.

In his 1995 autobiography Take It Like a Man, Boy George wrote that Rossdale had a relationship with Peter Robinson, also known as Marilyn, in the 1980s. In a 1996 interview for Rolling Stone, Rossdale responded, "That's George's take – he doesn't know me. There's a queue of people going to their lawyers about stuff in his book..I hope he manages to sell some books by putting my name in there." Elsewhere, both Rossdale and Robinson initially denied the story; however, in 2003, Robinson dedicated the Marilyn single "Hold on Tight" to Rossdale, citing "the years of [their] passionate relationship" and featuring a photo of him and Rossdale on the cover. Later, both men spoke more candidly about their past relationship. In 2009, Robinson confirmed that he and Rossdale had been "together [for] five years" in the 1980s. In 2010 Rossdale acknowledged having a liaison with Robinson, describing it as experimentation and "part of growing up". Robinson later called Rossdale "the love of my life".

In 2004, a paternity test revealed that Rossdale was the father of Pearl Lowe's daughter, Daisy Lowe (born 1989). Rossdale and Pearl had a brief relationship, and Rossdale had been Daisy's godfather. Rossdale subsequently cut off all contact with Pearl and Daisy. In 2009, however, several websites published photos of Daisy walking with Rossdale's son in London. Both Daisy and Rossdale said in 2010 that their relationship is good and based on respect.

Discography

with Bush

Sixteen Stone (1994)
Razorblade Suitcase (1996)
Deconstructed (1997)
The Science of Things (1999)
Golden State (2001)
The Sea of Memories (2011)
Man on the Run (2014)
Black and White Rainbows (2017)
The Kingdom (2020)
The Art of Survival (2022)

with Institute

 Distort Yourself (2005)

Solo

Studio albums

Singles

As lead artist

As featured artist

References

External links

1965 births
Living people
Anglo-Scots
British male songwriters
Bush (British band) members
English baritones
English Jews
English male guitarists
English people of Russian-Jewish descent
English people of Scottish descent
English rock guitarists
English rock singers
English songwriters
Jewish rock musicians
People educated at Westminster School, London
People from Kilburn, London
Post-grunge musicians